The Girard Avenue Bridge is an automobile and trolley bridge in Philadelphia, Pennsylvania, that carries Girard Avenue (U.S. Route 13) over the Schuylkill River. It connects the east and west sections of Fairmount Park, and the Brewerytown neighborhood with the Philadelphia Zoo. The current bridge is the third built on the site.

First bridge
The first Girard Avenue Bridge was built 1852-55. Rudolph Hering is credited with the design; it was constructed by Adolphus Bonzano, and cost $267,000. It carried Girard Avenue over the East River Drive, the Schuylkill River, the Schuylkill Canal, and the West River Drive. A horse-drawn trolley was added in 1859. The trolley route later became the SEPTA Route 15 trolley. The bridge was a three span timber arched Howe truss bridge.

The bridge lasted less than 20 years. In December 1872, a grand jury found that it was poorly constructed and dangerous. A temporary bridge was constructed, that also served as falsework for the second bridge.

Second bridge
The second Girard Avenue Bridge was built 1873-74, in anticipation of the 1876 Centennial Exposition that was to be held in West Fairmount Park. It was designed by Clarke, Reeves & Company, Engineers, built by the Phoenix Bridge Company, and cost $1,404,445. When completed, it was believed to be the largest high bridge in the United States: 1000 feet (304.8 m) in length and 100 feet (30.5 m) in width. It opened on July 4, 1874, three days after the Philadelphia Zoo. In 1895, the trolley crossing it was electrified. The bridge was a five span iron Pratt truss bridge.

Third (current) bridge
The third and current Girard Avenue Bridge was built 1969-72. The ornate iron railings of the 1873-74 bridge were retained for the modern highway bridge. Trolleys crossing the bridge were replaced by buses in 1992, but SEPTA Route 15 trolley service was restored in 2005.

The western terminus of the bridge is the congested intersection of 34th Street and West Girard Avenue. The Philadelphia Zoo occupies the southwest corner, and the Mantua Junction Viaduct crosses over Lansdowne Drive and West Girard Avenue, then curves around the zoo. The Schuylkill Expressway's Philadelphia Zoo Exit (Exit 342) is immediately south of the intersection.

See also
 
 
 
 
 List of crossings of the Schuylkill River

References

External links

Video of a trolley crossing the third Girard Avenue Bridge from Flickr.

Bridges in Philadelphia
Bridges completed in 1874
Bridges over the Schuylkill River
Historic American Buildings Survey in Philadelphia
Road bridges in Pennsylvania
Railroad bridges in Pennsylvania
Road-rail bridges in the United States
U.S. Route 13
Bridges of the United States Numbered Highway System
Pratt truss bridges in the United States